Teleradiology is the transmission of radiological patient images, such as x-rays, CTs, and MRIs, from one location to another for the purposes of sharing studies with other radiologists and physicians. Teleradiology is a growth technology given that imaging procedures are growing approximately 15% annually against an increase of only 2% in the radiologist population.

Teleradiology allows radiologists to provide services without actually having to be at the location of the patient.  This is particularly important when a sub-specialist such as an MRI radiologist, neuroradiologist, pediatric radiologist, or musculoskeletal radiologist is needed, since these professionals are generally only located in large metropolitan areas working during daytime hours. Teleradiology allows for trained specialists to be available 24/7.
 
Teleradiology utilizes standard network technologies such as the internet, telephone lines, wide area network, local area network (LAN) and the latest high tech being computer clouds. Specialized software is used to transmit the images and enable the radiologist to effectively analyze what can be hundreds of images for a given study.  Technologies such as advanced graphics processing, voice recognition, artificial intelligence and image compression are often used in teleradiology.  Through tele radiology and mobile DICOM viewers, images can be sent to another part of the hospital, or to other locations around the world.

Reports
Teleradiologists can provide a Preliminary Read for emergency room cases and other emergency cases or a Final Read for the official patient record and for use in billing.

Preliminary Reports include all pertinent findings and a phone call for any critical findings. For some Teleradiology services, the turnaround time is extremely rapid with a 30-minute standard turnaround and expedited for critical and stroke studies. 
 
Teleradiology Final Reports can be provided for emergency and non-emergency studies. Final reports include all findings and require access to prior studies and all relevant patient information for a complete diagnosis. Phone calls with any critical findings are signs of quality services.

Teleradiology Preliminary or Final Reports can be provided for all doctors and hospitals overflow studies. Teleradiology can be available for intermittent coverage as an extension of practices and will provide patients with the highest quality care.

Subspecialties
Some teleradiologists are fellowship trained and have a wide variety of subspecialty expertise including such difficult-to-find areas as Neuroradiology, Pediatric Neuroradiology, Thoracic Imaging, Musculoskeletal Radiology, Mammography, and Nuclear Cardiology.
There are also various medical practitioners who are not radiologists that take on studies in radiology to become sub specialists in their respected fields, an example of this is dentistry where oral and maxillofacial radiology (Oral & Maxillofacial Radiology) allows those in dentistry to specialize in the acquisition and interpretation of radiographic imaging studies performed for diagnosis of treatment guidance for conditions affecting the maxillofacial region.

Regulations
In the United States, Medicare and Medicaid laws require the teleradiologist to be on U.S. soil in order to qualify for reimbursement of the Final Read.
 
In addition, advanced teleradiology systems must also be HIPAA compliant, which helps to ensure patients' privacy. HIPAA (Health Insurance Portability and Accountability Act of 1996) is a uniform, federal floor of privacy protections for consumers. It limits the ways that entities can use patients' personal information and protects the privacy of all medical information no matter what form it is in. Quality teleradiology must abide by important HIPAA rules to ensure patients' privacy is protected.

Also State laws governing the licensing requirements and medical malpractice insurance coverage required for physicians vary from state to state. Ensuring compliance with these laws is a significant overhead expense for larger multi-state teleradiology groups.

Medicare (Australia) has identical requirements to that of the United States, where the guidelines are provided by the Department of Health and Ageing, and government based payments fall under the Health Insurance Act.

The regulations in Australia are also conducted at both federal and state levels, ensuring that strict guidelines are adhered to at all times, with regular yearly updates and amendments are introduced (usually around March and November of every year), ensuring that the legislation is kept up to date with changes in the industry.

One of the most recent changes to Medicare and Radiology / Teleradiology in Australia was the introduction of the Diagnostic Imaging Accreditation Scheme (DIAS) on the 1st of July 2008. DIAS was introduced to further improve the quality of Diagnostic Imaging and to amend the Health Insurance Act.

Industry growth

Until the late 1990s teleradiology was primarily used by individual radiologists to interpret occasional emergency studies from offsite locations, often in the radiologists home. The connections were made through standard analog phone lines.

Teleradiology expanded rapidly as the growth of the internet and broad band combined with new CT scanner technology to become an essential tool in trauma cases in emergency rooms throughout the country. The occasional 2-3 x ray studies a week soon became 3-10 CT scans, or more, a night. Because ER physicians are not trained to read CT scans or MRIs, radiologists went from working 8–10 hours a day, five and half days a week to a schedule of 24 hours a day, 7 days a week coverage. This became a particularly acute challenge in smaller rural facilities that only had one solo radiologist with no other to share call.

These circumstances spawned a post-dot.com boom of firms and groups that provided medical outsourcing, off-site teleradiology on-call services to hospitals and Radiology Groups around the country. As an example, a teleradiology firm might cover trauma at a hospital in Indiana with doctors based in Texas. Some firms even used overseas doctors in locations like Australia and India. Nighthawk, founded by Paul Berger, was the first to station U.S. licensed radiologists overseas (initially Australia and later Switzerland) to maximize the time zone difference to provide nightcall in U.S. hospitals.

Currently, teleradiology firms are facing pricing pressures. Industry consolidation is likely as there are more than 500 of these firms, large and small, throughout the United States.

Nonprofit 

Although teleradiology is flourishing in the developed world, few teleradiological links have been made to the developing world. Generally, barriers to the implementation of radiology services have also complicated setting up reliable links.

Several examples of simple, low-cost nonprofit teleradiology solutions have been employed by Satellife and the Swinfen Charitable Trust. Established in 1987 by Nobel Peace Prize laureate, Bernard Lown, Satellife (Boston) was the first non-profit organization to own and use a low earth-orbit satellite as well as mobile computing devices such as handheld computers and mobile phones for medical data communication. Starting in 1998, Swinfen Charitable Trust, a U.K. based nonprofit organization founded by Lord and Lady Swinfen, gave healthcare personnel in remote places internet access and a digital camera, and also facilitated a low-cost telemedicine service linking doctors at hospitals in the developing world with medical and surgical consultants who gave advice at no cost.

More complex solutions emerged in 2007. Operated by volunteer radiologists, Téléradiologie sans Frontières (Teleradiology without Borders), a Luxembourg-based nonprofit organization founded  by  Dr Jean-Baptiste Niedercorn and Dr Gérald Wajnapel, started to provide teleradiology imaging services to developing  countries using a professional cloud picture archiving and communications system (PACS).

Today, many established private teleradiology practices such as Virtual Radiologic (vRad) are also involved in pilot programs with NGOs, reporting radiographs from rural health centres, free of charge.

See also 
 DICOM
 PACS
 Radiology
 RIS
 Telemedicine
 TelePACS
 AI

References

Radiology
Telemedicine
Image processing